Deir Maker (Arabic: دير ماكر) is a Syrian village in the Qatana District of the Rif Dimashq Governorate. According to the Syria Central Bureau of Statistics (CBS), Deir Maker had a population of 3,228 in the 2004 census.

References

External links

Populated places in Qatana District